The 11th edition of the annual Hypo-Meeting took place on May 25 and May 26, 1985 in Götzis, Austria. The track and field competition featured a decathlon (men) and a heptathlon (women) event.

Men's Decathlon

Schedule

May 25

May 26

Records

Results

Women's Heptathlon

Schedule

May 25

May 26

Records

Results

Notes

References
 Statistics
 decathlon2000
 1985 Year Ranking Decathlon

1985
Hypo-Meeting
Hypo-Meeting